The 1983 Michigan State Spartans football team represented the Michigan State University as a member of the Big Ten Conference during the 1983 NCAA Division I-A football season. Led by first-year head coach George Perles, the Spartans compiled an overall record of 4–6–1 with a mark of 2–6–1 in conference play, placing seventh in the Big Ten. The Spartans offense scored 162 points while the defense allowed 233 points.

Schedule

Roster

Game summaries

Purdue

Source:

Team players drafted into the NFL

References

Michigan State
Michigan State Spartans football seasons
Michigan State Spartans football